Jacques Demers (born August 25, 1944) is a former Canadian Senator, former broadcaster and former professional ice hockey head coach. After a lengthy coaching career in the World Hockey Association and in the National Hockey League, Demers became an analyst for Montreal Canadiens games on RDS. On August 27, 2009, he was nominated by Prime Minister Stephen Harper to fill the Canadian Senate seat vacated by Yoine Goldstein. Senator Demers represented the Conservative Party in the Senate until December 2015 when he resigned from the Conservative caucus in order to sit as an Independent. On his 75th birthday on August 25, 2019 Senator Demers left his position as Senator.

WHA
Two of the franchises Demers coached in the WHA were the Chicago Cougars and the Quebec Nordiques. Additionally, he was the exceedingly popular coach of the Indianapolis Racers, which won the Eastern Division championship under his guidance. Demers had the opportunity to coach Wayne Gretzky in the 1979 WHA All-Star Series. The format of the series was a three-game set that pitted the WHA All-Stars against HC Moscow Dynamo. Demers asked Gordie Howe if it was okay to put him on a line with Wayne Gretzky and his son Mark Howe. In Game One, the line scored seven points as the WHA All-Stars won by a score of 4–2. In Game Two, Gretzky and Mark Howe each scored a goal and Gordie Howe picked up an assist as the WHA won 4–2. The line did not score in the final game, but the WHA won by a score of 4–3.

NHL
While in the NHL, he coached the Quebec Nordiques, St. Louis Blues, Detroit Red Wings, Montreal Canadiens and Tampa Bay Lightning. He won two consecutive Jack Adams Awards as NHL Coach of the Year, with Detroit in both 1987 and 1988. He is the only person to win the award in consecutive years. He was also responsible for naming longtime Red Wing Steve Yzerman as team captain. In 1993, he led Montreal to its most recent Stanley Cup.  Only two years later, however, the Canadiens missed the playoffs altogether for the first time since 1970.  After an 0-5 start to the 1995-96 season, Demers was fired.

While in Tampa Bay, he was responsible for guiding Vincent Lecavalier through his first two years in the NHL.  He displayed a fatherly attitude toward the young star, often pulling him aside during practice to lecture him in their native French.  During the 1998-99 season, he also served as the Lightning's general manager.

In 2007, he was named the 100th most influential personality in hockey by The Hockey News.

Coaching record

NHL

WHA

AHL

Literacy struggles
On November 2, 2005, Demers released a biography, written by Mario Leclerc, entitled En toutes lettres (English translation: All Spelled Out), in which he revealed that he is functionally illiterate. According to Demers, he never really learned to read or write because of his abusive childhood in Montreal. He covered for himself by asking secretaries and public relations people to read letters for him, claiming he could not read English well enough to understand them (though he speaks English and French equally well). When he served as general manager of the Lightning, he brought in Cliff Fletcher and Jay Feaster as his assistants; as it turned out, they did most of the work a general manager would normally do because Demers knew he could not do it himself.

Political career
On August 28, 2009, CBC Radio One reported that Demers was chosen to fill the Senate seat of Yoine Goldstein by Prime Minister Harper. According to the CBC report, he has "raised awareness about literacy issues" by "going public with his own struggles."  A series of Montreal residents were interviewed regarding his Senate appointment and they were generally positive about the move. Many noted, however, that it was "important that he learn to read."

Demers served in the Senate until reaching the mandatory retirement age of 75 on August 25, 2019.

Health
On July 5, 2010, Demers was reported to be in stable condition after undergoing two emergency surgeries.

Demers was hospitalized after experiencing a stroke in April 2016. He remained in stable condition in a Montreal hospital.

In October 2016, Demers was hospitalized for a serious infection.

Since his 2016 stroke, he has been living with aphasia.

Honours
In 2010, he was elected as an inaugural inductee into the World Hockey Association Hall of Fame in the coaching category.
In 2014, Demers was named the Honorary Lieutenant-Colonel of the Canadian Grenadier Guards, a Montreal-based, Canadian Army Primary Reserve infantry unit.

References

External links

 
Former NHL Coach admits illiteracy – CTV news

1944 births
21st-century Canadian politicians
Canadian ice hockey coaches
Canadian senators from Quebec
Canadian sportsperson-politicians
Cincinnati Stingers
Conservative Party of Canada senators
Detroit Red Wings coaches
French Quebecers
Ice hockey people from Montreal
Independent Canadian senators
Indianapolis Racers
Jack Adams Award winners
Living people
Montreal Canadiens coaches
National Hockey League broadcasters
Politicians from Montreal
Quebec Nordiques announcers
Quebec Nordiques coaches
St. Louis Blues coaches
Stanley Cup champions
Stanley Cup championship-winning head coaches
Tampa Bay Lightning coaches
Tampa Bay Lightning executives